The Château d'Arques-la-Bataille is a 12th-century castle in the commune of Arques-la-Bataille in the Seine-Maritime département of France.

The castle is owned by the state. It has been listed since 1875 as a monument historique by the French Ministry of Culture.

See also
List of castles in France

References

External links

 
 Château d'Arques on the Castleland.com web site in French or in English
 History and chronology of the castle on persocite.francite.com. 
 Association "Sauvegardons le château d'Arques" 
Photos and history of the castle English

Castles in Seine-Maritime
Ruined castles in Normandy